"The Colour of Love" is a 1992 Techno House song recorded, written and produced by The Reese Project, which consisted of Kevin "Reese" Saunderson, his wife Ann Saunderson,  Michael Nanton, and Rachel Kapp, who was the lead singer on the track, which dealt with racial unity. The single, taken from the Giant/Warner album Faith Hope and Clarity, reached number one on the Billboard Hot Dance/Club Play chart on October 3, 1992, and spent two weeks there.

Track listing
CD maxi (US)
   "The Colour Of Love (Underground Resistance 7" Mix)" (4:41) 
   "The Colour Of Love (Underground Resistance Jazzed Up Mix)" (4:45) 
   "The Colour Of Love (Underground Resistance 12" Mix)" (5:15)
   "The Colour Of Love (Deep Reese Mix)"  (5:47)
   "The Colour Of Love (Marc Kinchen Deep Dub Remix)" (6:36)
   "The Colour Of Love (Juan Atkins Techno Remix)" (5:19)

See also
 List of number-one dance singles of 1992 (U.S.)

References

External links
Album version on YouTube

1992 songs
1992 singles
Electronic songs
House music songs
Techno songs
Giant Records (Warner) singles